Pieris floribunda is a North American species of broadleaf evergreen shrub, a member of the fetterbush genus in the blueberry family (Ericaceae). It is commonly known in North America as mountain fetterbush or mountain andromeda. All parts of Pieris floribunda are poisonous if ingested. In landscapes it should be grown in full to part shade, out of windy locations, and have a good quality soil with much organic matter with acidity of pH 4.5 to 6.5.

The mountain fetterbush is less subject to damage from the Azalea lacebug that often infests the related Pieris japonica.

Description
It has erect or erect with just slightly nodding panicles of white urn-shaped flowers that form in autumn as erect pink buds. The gray-brown bark is shaggy and peeling when mature.

Distribution
Pieris floribunda is native to the eastern United States, primarily the southern Appalachian Mountains in the States of Tennessee, North and South Carolina, Georgia, Virginia and West Virginia. It thrives in areas of land disturbed by human activity. In common with other members of Pieris, it grows better on well drained soils.

Cultivars
There is a cultivar of a hybrid between the American and Japanese species called 'Brouwer's Beauty' that does adapt easily to cultivation and bears intermediate flower clusters that are erect and yet drooping also.

It produces small urn-shaped cream-coloured flowers in spring. It has won the Royal Horticultural Society's Award of Garden Merit.

References

External links
Go Botany, New England Wildflower Society
Herbář Wendys - Pieris floribunda - pieris květnatá  in Czech with photos

floribunda
Flora of the Eastern United States
Plants described in 1813
Taxa named by Joseph Dalton Hooker
Taxa named by George Bentham